Deborah Springstead Ford (born 1954) is an American photographer noted for her fine art black and white combination printed photographs exploring ambiguous perceptual realities. She has photographed her family, western landscapes and cultural artifacts, with much of her photographic work drawing on the relationships between science and art, the natural world and cultural geography. Most recently her photographs of oil and gas exploration in the Powder River Basin and the high desert west have received attention and been published in Arid. Her work has been exhibited in solo and group exhibits in museums and galleries around the continent, and is included in many private and public collections such as the Center for Creative Photography, California Museum of Photography, and Northlight Gallery.  She has been an arts advocate, educator and program administrator in addition to being a professional visual artist for over 30 years. Ford attended Minneapolis College of Art & Design, Arizona State University and Goddard College. She has a BFA in Photography, a Master's in Art Education/Photographic Studies and an MFA in Interdisciplinary Arts. She was a professor of Photographic Studies at Prescott College. She taught photography full-time from 1982-2013, the last 18 years at Prescott College in northern Arizona. As an arts advocate, Ford was instrumental in the creation of the Prescott College Art Gallery. The gallery and Ford have both been nominated for Arizona Governor's Art Awards. She has received numerous awards and fellowships, including four Arizona Commission on the Arts Grants (including a 2009 Artist Project Grant ) and participated in many Artist-in-Residence programs around the country including the Biosphere 2, Ucross Foundation, Anderson Center for Interdisciplinary Arts, Sitka Center for Art & Ecology, Joshua Tree National Park, Isle Royale National Park, and Aspen Guard Station. Ford's photographs have been exhibited nationally and internationally. Recent publications include a profile in Black and White Magazine, Issue #82. (April 2011) and photographs in Orion magazine (November/December 2013).  Ford was the Executive Director of Playa, in Summer Lake Oregon, a residency program for visual artists, scientists, writers and others engaged with creative inquiry from 2013-2017.

Art 

Ford's early work incorporated 19th century photographic processes including cyanotype, van dyke, and combination printing methods in and out of the darkroom. Her photographic constructions use images of landscapes and other artifacts to create narratives as an avenue to examine cultural and environmental issues. Much of her work explores ideas related to westward expansion, sustainability, cultural memory and climate change amidst the search for natural resources.

Notable works 
 A Nearly Fatal Illusion
 Cartography and the Cultural Terrain
 CHON
 Common Ground
 Body Language

Awards 
 Artist in Residence Biosphere2, Oracle Arizona.
  Visiting Artist, Hellenic International Studies in the Arts, Parikia, Paros Greece.
 2010 Individual Nominee for the Arizona Governors Art Awards
 Arizona Commission on the Arts Artist Project Grant to Individual Artist
 Arizona Commission on the Arts Professional Development Grant
 Artist in Residence: Joshua Tree National Park, CA.
 Arizona Commission on the Arts Career Development Grant.
 Artist in Residence: Aspen Guard Station, Dolores, CO
 Artist in Residence: Glacier National Park, MT.
 Artist in Residence: Sitka Center for Art & Ecology, Otis, OR
 Artist in Residence: Ucross Foundation, Clearmont, WY
 Artist–in-Residence: Anderson Center for Interdisciplinary Studies, Red Wing MN
 Artist-in-Residence: Isle Royale National Park, Houghton, MI
 Women In Photography, Bryn Mawr College 1989
 Journal of Contemporary Photography, October, 1989.

Personal life 
Born in 1954 and raised in Anoka, Minnesota. She has lived most of her adult life in Prescott Arizona with her husband and three children.

References 

Deborah Ford: Cartography and the Cultural Terrain, exhibition catalog, Paris Gibson Square Museum of Art. Aug 2010.

External links 

Official website

1954 births
American photographers
Living people